Oryctometopia fossulatella is a moth of the family Pyralidae. It was described by Ragonot in 1888, and is known from Costa Rica and Puerto Rico.

References

Moths described in 1888
Phycitinae